Platycerus depressus is a species of stag beetle, from the Lucinidae family and Lucaninae subfamily. It was discovered by Joseph LeConte in 1850.

Geographical distribution 
It can be found in North America.

References 

Lucanidae
Beetles described in 1850